Attorney General Evans may refer to:

Gareth Evans (politician) (born 1944), Attorney General of Australia
George Evans (American politician) (1797–1867), Attorney General of Maine
Tom Evans (Western Australian politician) (1929–1995), Attorney-General of Western Australia
William Evans (Australian politician) (1856–1914), Attorney-General of Victoria

See also
Lois Browne-Evans (1927–2007), Attorney General of Bermuda
General Evans (disambiguation)